The 2022 National Women's Soccer League season was the tenth season of the National Women's Soccer League, the top division of women's soccer in the United States. Including the NWSL's two professional predecessors, Women's Professional Soccer (2009–2011) and the Women's United Soccer Association (2001–2003), it was the 16th overall season of FIFA and USSF-sanctioned top division women's soccer in the United States. Twelve teams competed in the league, including two expansion teams, San Diego Wave FC and Angel City FC.

The NWSL regular season, comprising 22 games for each team, began on April 29 and ended on October 2, 2022. OL Reign topped the standing with 40 points and thus won the NWSL Shield. The championship playoffs were held from October 16-29 and were won by Portland Thorns FC, who defeated the Kansas City Current 2-0 in the final and thus became the NWSL champions. The year also included the 2022 NWSL Challenge Cup, which was played from March 18 to May 7 and overlapped with the start of the regular season. It was won by the North Carolina Courage, who defeated the Washington Spirit 2-1 in the final.

This season was the first in which the total attendance exceeded one million.

Teams, stadiums, and personnel

Team names 
On October 21, 2020, the Los Angeles expansion team announced its name as Angel City FC.

On October 30, 2021, the NWSL franchise in Kansas City announced its new name as Kansas City Current.

On November 9, 2021, the San Diego expansion team announced its name as San Diego Wave FC.

Stadiums and locations 

Capacities listed here are full capacities, and do not reflect COVID-19 restrictions.

Personnel and sponsorship 
Note: All teams use Nike as their kit manufacturer as part of a league-wide sponsorship agreement renewed in November 2021.

Coaching changes

Regular season

Standings

Tiebreakers 
The initial determining factor for a team's position in the standings is most points earned, with three points earned for a win, one point for a draw, and zero points for a loss. If two or more teams tie in total points total when determining rank, playoff qualification, and seeding, the NWSL uses the following tiebreaker criteria, going down the list until all teams are ranked.

 Greater goal difference across the entire regular season (against all teams, not just tied teams).
 Most total wins across the entire regular season (against all teams, not just tied teams).
 Most goals scored across the entire regular season (against all teams, not just tied teams).
 Head-to-head results (total points) between the tied teams.
 Head-to-head most goals scored between the tied teams.
 Least disciplinary points accumulated across the entire regular season (against all teams, not just tied teams).
 Coin flip (if two teams are tied) or drawing of lots (if three or more teams are tied).

Results

Positions by week 
Considering each week to end when the NWSL releases their weekly standing tweet 

Legend: Gold = first place; green = playoff position; Red = last place.

Attendance

Average home attendances 
Ranked from highest to lowest average attendance.

Regular season

Updated through October 2, 2022

Highest attendances
Regular season

Updated through October 2, 2022.

Statistical leaders

Top scorers

Top assists

Clean sheets

Hat-tricks 

4 Player scored 4 goals

Playoffs 

The top six teams from the regular season qualified for the NWSL Championship playoffs, with the top two teams receiving a first-round bye. On August 23, 2022, the league announced that the championship match would be held on October 29, 2022, at Audi Field in Washington, D.C., with domestic broadcast on CBS and a prime-time kickoff at 8 p.m. EDT.

First round

Semi-finals

Championship  

Championship Game MVP: Sophia Smith (POR)

Challenge Cup

Championship

Individual awards

Annual awards

Teams of the Year 
Announced October 25, 2022

Best XI

Second XI

Monthly Awards

Player of the Month

Rookie of the Month

Team of the Month

Weekly awards

References

External links 

 
2022
National Women's Soccer League
National Women's Soccer League season